The Granite Range is a mountain range in Washoe County, Nevada west of the town of Gerlach and the lower Black Rock Desert playa.

Adjacent mountain ranges are the Fox Range and Calico Hills. Smoke Creek Desert is also near.

References 

Mountain ranges of Washoe County, Nevada
Mountain ranges of Nevada